The Edward Harrison Memorial Prize was awarded from 1926 to 1979 by the Chemical Society and from 1980 to 2007 by its successor the Royal Society of Chemistry to a British chemist who was under 32 years of age, and working the fields of theoretical or physical chemistry. It  commemorated the work of Edward Harrison who was credited with producing the first serviceable gas mask and whose work saved many lives.

In 2008 the prize was joined with the Meldola Medal and Prize to form the Harrison-Meldola Memorial Prizes.

Winners
Winners include

 For 2009 onwards, see Harrison-Meldola Memorial Prizes

See also
 List of chemistry awards

References

External links

Awards of the Royal Society of Chemistry
Awards established in 1926